Vadim Calugher (born 7 September 1995) is a Moldovan footballer who plays as a midfielder for SCM Zalău.

References

External links

Notes

1995 births
Living people
Footballers from Chișinău
Moldovan footballers
Association football midfielders
Moldovan Super Liga players
FC Milsami Orhei players
FC Zimbru Chișinău players
Speranța Nisporeni players
CS Petrocub Hîncești players
FC Sfîntul Gheorghe players
Liga II players
ACS Poli Timișoara players
Moldovan expatriate footballers
Moldovan expatriate sportspeople in Romania
Expatriate footballers in Romania